Jupiter Science College is a residential  college in Bhubaneswar, Odisha state, India founded in 2002. 

It consists of two campuses, one each for boys and girls. It is a member of the Gita Group of Institutions, a consortium of 10 technical universities in Odisha. Jupiter College relocated to its own property on the outskirts of Bhubaneswar in 2009.

Jupiter teaches English, physics, chemistry, and mathematics, electronics, and statistics, among other subjects. The school began admitting girls in 2010.

Education in Bhubaneswar
Science and technology in Bhubaneswar
2002 establishments in Orissa
Educational institutions established in 2002